In mathematics, a polynomial transformation consists of computing the polynomial whose roots are a given function of the roots of a polynomial. Polynomial transformations such as Tschirnhaus transformations are often used to simplify the solution of algebraic equations.

Simple examples

Translating the roots
Let 

be a polynomial, and 
 
be its complex roots (not necessarily distinct).

For any constant , the polynomial whose roots are 
 
is 

Reciprocals of the roots
Let 

be a polynomial.

Scaling the roots

Let 

be a polynomial, and  be a non-zero constant.

This polynomial transformation is often used to reduce questions on algebraic numbers to questions on algebraic integers.

For examples of this, see Cubic function § Reduction to a depressed cubic or Quartic function § Converting to a depressed quartic.

Transformation by a rational function
All preceding examples are polynomial transformations by a rational function, also called Tschirnhaus transformations. Let 

Such a polynomial transformation may be computed as a resultant.

This is exactly the defining property of the resultant

This is generally difficult to compute by hand. However, as most computer algebra systems have a built-in function to compute resultants, it is straightforward to compute it with a computer.

Properties
If the polynomial  is irreducible, then either the resulting polynomial  is irreducible, or it is a power of an irreducible polynomial.

Transformation for equation-solving

Polynomial transformations have been applied to the simplification of polynomial equations for solution, where possible, by radicals.  Descartes introduced the transformation of a polynomial of degree  which eliminates the term of degree  by a translation of the roots.  Such a polynomial is termed depressed. This already suffices to solve the quadratic by square roots. In the case of the cubic, Tschirnhaus transformations replace the variable by a quadratic function, thereby making it possible to eliminate two terms, and so can be used to eliminate the linear term in a depressed cubic to achieve the solution of the cubic by a combination of square and cube roots.  The Bring–Jerrard transformation, which is quartic in the variable, brings a quintic into Bring-Jerrard normal form with terms of degree 5,1, and 0.

References
 

Algebra